Le Car may refer to:

 Renault Le Car, the name used to market the Renault 5 automobile in the United States
 Le Car, an electric car model from LeEco
 Le Car (band), an American electronic musical group
 Maud Le Car (born 1992) model and surfer

See also
 Morris–Lecar model, biological neuron model 
 Le Supercar, an electric car model from LeEco
 Boris Lekar (1932-2010) Soviet artist
 Ləkər, Azerbaijan; a village
 Car (disambiguation)
 Le (disambiguation)